Əcəmi (also, Adzhami) is a village and municipality in the Yevlakh Rayon of Azerbaijan.  It has a population of 378.

References 

Populated places in Yevlakh District